The women's K-2 500 metres canoeing event at the 2019 Pan American Games was held between the 29 and 30 of July at the Albufera Medio Mundo in the city of Huacho.

Results

Heats
Qualification Rules: 1..2->Final, Rest -> Semifinals

Heat 1

Heat 2

Semifinal
Qualification Rules: 1..4->Final, Rest Out

Final

References

Canoeing at the 2019 Pan American Games